Indonesian Women's Professional Futsal League (Indonesian: Liga Futsal Profesional Wanita Indonesia) is the main competition futsal for women at the national level and is in Indonesia, organized by the Indonesian Futsal Federation (FFI). This competition began in the 2012–2013 season and until now it has been arranged 6 times. This competition was held in conjunction with the title of the Indonesia Pro Futsal League.

In addition to finding the best futsal women's club champion, this competition was held as the best player for the Indonesia women's national futsal team invited.

Teams 
The following 6 clubs will be compete in the Indonesia Women's Pro Futsal League during the 2022 season.

List of champions

List of best players

List of top-goalscorers

References 

Futsal leagues in Indonesia